Donald Theetge (born October 3, 1966) is a Canadian professional stock car racing driver. He competes part-time in the ARCA Menards Series, driving the No. 74 Toyota Camry for Visconti Motorsports, as well as the NASCAR Pinty's Series driving his own No. 80 Chevrolet Camaro.

Racing career

CASCAR / NASCAR Pinty's Series

Xfinity Series 
In July 2018, Theetge made his NASCAR Xfinity Series debut at New Hampshire. He finished 33rd, driving the No. 90 for fellow Canadian Mario Gosselin's DGM Racing team. He returned to make another start for them in the race at ISM Raceway (Phoenix) in November, scoring a 25th-place finish. In 2019, Theetge would again run two races that year for DGM, which came at Las Vegas in the No. 90 and Richmond in the No. 36. In 2020, Theetge would return to the team and the Xfinity Series for the third straight year, although not until the very end of the season. He was announced to be running the final two races of the year, Martinsville and Phoenix. in the No. 90.

Other racing 
Theetge won the Série IMAX LMS Québec in 2004, followed by the Série nationale Castrol LMS Québec in 2006 and Quebec's ACT Series in 2009. He won 19 races in the ACT Series and Série nationale Castrol LMS Québec. Theetge also won two races in the US-based ACT Tour Series, both at Circuit Riverside Speedway Ste-Croix in 2006 and 2007.

Theetge also made some road racing starts with his brother Benoit, including in the Grand-Am Continental Tire Sports Car Challenge, where they finished third at the Daytona International Speedway in 2010.

Motorsports career results

NASCAR
(key) (Bold – Pole position awarded by qualifying time. Italics – Pole position earned by points standings or practice time. * – Most laps led.)

Xfinity Series

ARCA Menards Series

ARCA Menards Series East

Pinty's Series

CASCAR
(key) (Bold – Pole position awarded by qualifying time. Italics – Pole position earned by points standings or practice time. * – Most laps led.)

CASCAR Super Series

 Season still in progress 
 Ineligible for series points

References

External links
 Donald Theetge on thethirdturn.com
 
 Donald Theetge on Stock Car Quebec
 

1966 births
Racing drivers from Quebec
NASCAR drivers
Living people
Sportspeople from Quebec